The following is a list of notable alumni from Waynesburg University. Waynesburg University is a private university founded in ca. 1850 and located in Waynesburg, Pennsylvania.

Alumni 
Mary Temple Bayard (1853-1916), American writer, journalist
Don Herrmann, National Football League wide receiver for the New York Giants and the New Orleans Saints
John F. "Jack" Wiley, former National Football League player for the Pittsburgh Steelers, University of Pittsburgh Assistant Coach, and Waynesburg University's football stadium bears his name
Charles E. Boyle, Democratic member of the U.S. House of Representatives from Pennsylvania
Albert Baird Cummins, 18th Governor of Iowa, U.S. Senator and two-time presidential candidate
William C. Farabee, Harvard anthropologist
George Nethercutt, Harvard fellow and republican member of the U.S. House of Representatives
John Clark Knox, Judge of the United States District Court for the Southern District of New York
Edward Martin, Commanding General of the 28th Infantry Division 1941,  Major General, 28th Infantry Division, Service, 1898-1942, Spanish-American War, Border War, World War I, World War II in the United States National Guard, who was prominent in the development of Fort Indiantown Gap and after his death, the United States Senate renamed the facility the Edward Martin Military Reservation 32nd Governor of Pennsylvania in office January 19, 1943 – January 2, 1947 18th Treasurer of Pennsylvania in office January 15, 1929 – January 17, 1933 Chair of the Pennsylvania Republican Party In office May 12, 1928 – June 9, 1934 23rd Auditor General of Pennsylvania In office January 20, 1925 – January 15, 1929 United States Senator from Pennsylvania in office January 3, 1947 – January 3, 1959 Chair of the National Governors Association in office July 1, 1945 – May 26, 1946
Thomas Ellsworth Morgan, Democratic member of the U.S. House of Representatives from Pennsylvania
Phil Mushnick, New York Post sports columnist
Morgan Ringland Wise, member of the 46th and 47th Congress of the United States
Lanny Frattare, Sports Broadcasting faculty, Pittsburgh Pirates announcer for 33 years
Dave Pahanish, American Singer/Songwriter
James Purman, Medal of Honor recipient. 
Clair Bee (1896–1983), Basketball coach, inductee to the Basketball Hall of Fame
Joe Righetti (born 1947), American football player
Matt Dowling, Member of the Pennsylvania House of Representatives
Harry Theofiledes, National League football player
Charles I. Faddis, Democratic member of the U.S. House of Representatives - Pennsylvania
William E. Crow, Senator from Pennsylvania
Lucy Dorsey Iams, reform legislator
Lorenzo Danford, U.S. Representative from Ohio
Dave Smith, National League football player
John Renton, Geology professor
Joseph Warren Ray, Republican member of the U.S. House of Representatives - Pennsylvania
Alta Schrock, Biology professor
Thomas S. Crago, Republican member of the U.S. House of Representatives - Pennsylvania
Paul Stanley, National League basketball player
Joseph Benton Donley, Republican member of the U.S. House of Representatives - Pennsylvania
Roy E. Furman, 21st Lieutenant Governor of Pennsylvania
Daniel J. McDaid, Legislator and judge
Pam Snyder, Democratic member of the Pennsylvania House of Representatives

References 

Waynesburg University alumni